East Lancashire Coachbuilders Limited was a manufacturer of bus bodies and carriages founded in 1934 in Blackburn, Lancashire, England. The company went into administration for a short while in August 2007, before being bought by Darwen Group and performed a reverse takeover with Optare when its parent purchased the company in 2008 and its site and business was later closed in 2012.

History 
In 1994 the company expanded into new premises and commenced a programme of development that resulted in a range of single and double deck buses which was the primary source of income for the company.

On 17 August 2007, the company went into administration but was saved and bought out by the Darwen Group the next day. It is thought that the problem was a direct consequence of changing to the Euro IV chassis, with a shortage of Scania chassis being a factor. After the purchase, the Darwen Group rebranded the company as Darwen East Lancs.

In 2008, Jamesstan Investments, an investment company controlled by the Darwen Group, purchased another bus manufacturer, Optare. Later, in June 2008, a reverse takeover was performed, with the Darwen name disappearing in favour of Optare's. This brings East Lancs name into the Optare Group, with an expanded range of vehicles.

Production of all the original East Lancs bodies ceased by 2011, and the premises in Blackburn closed in 2012.

Products

East Lancs has had many different styles of bodywork. They had a tradition of using cacography, mostly replacing a letter i with a letter y, which continued until the Esteem and Olympus series.
Greenway
EL2000 predecessor to the Flyte
Cityzen predecessor to the OmniDekka
Pyoneer predecessor to the Lolyne

Low floor buses
In the early 1990s, East Lancs developed buses for the low floor market with the style of the body being based on the former East Lancs Pyoneer.

 Lolyne for Dennis Trident chassis.
 Vyking for Volvo B7TL chassis.
 Nordic for tri-axle Volvo B7L chassis.
Spryte for Dennis Dart and Volvo B6BLE chassis
Flyte - Step entrance variant that superseded the EL2000 on Scania, Volvo and Kirin chassis as well as Leyland Tiger rebodying.

Myllennium Facelift
In 1999, the buses received a front and interior overhaul with the style of the body being based on the new East Lancs Myllennium that was launched for the Millennium Dome routes.
Myllennium Lolyne with Dennis Trident chassis
Myllennium Vyking with Volvo B7TL chassis
Myllennium Lowlander with DAF/VDL DB250LF chassis
Myllennium Nordic for 3-axle Volvo B9TL
Myllennium for DAF SB220, MAN 14.220, Scania N94UB and Alexander Dennis Dart
Hyline, a high-floor variant used to re-body Leyland Tiger buses.

Kinetec 
The Kinetec was launched at the Euro Bus Expo 2006. They are designed as low-floor bodies for MAN chassis. They have the Esteem/Olympus body but with MAN's own Lion's City design front and rear. A double decker based on the Kinetec was built called the Kinetec+ however it was a one off order and Kinetec buses were phased out with the new acquisition by Darwen Group in 2008.

Scania and Esteem product range

These buses are the last surviving variants of the original low floor series which became part of their own series. The Scania product range used the Myllennium styling but with Scania own front styling. Whereas the Esteem products used an original front, which developed into a new body entirely.

The Scania products were launched in 2004, however the OmniTown wasn't as well received as the company hoped and was discontinued after Darwen took over ownership.
OmniTown for Scania N94UB chassis
OmniDekka for Scania N94UD/N230UD/N270UD chassis

Both the Esteem and the Olympus (its double decker variant) were launched in 2006. An open top version of the Olympus, named East Lancs Visionaire was launched in summer 2007 with Arriva's The Original Tour.
Esteem for Alexander Dennis Enviro200 Dart, MAN 12.240, Scania N230UB, Scania N94UB and Alexander Dennis Enviro300 chassis
Olympus for Alexander Dennis Enviro400, VDL DB250, Volvo B9TL and Scania N230UD chassis
Visionaire open-top body for Volvo B9TL chassis

Production of these buses continued under Darwen ownership.

Related companies
British City Bus was the parent company that owned East Lancashire Coachbuilders. The company was dissolved after Darwen Group rescued East Lancs from administration in 2007.

East Lancs Overseas was a subsidiary of East Lancashire Coachbuilders in charge of taking orders and exporting buses. It was dissolved after Darwen Group rescued East Lancs from administration in 2007.
Darwen North West was a vehicle repair business in Blackburn, England, offering coach refurbishment, repair, maintenance, and conversion services. It was originally a subsidiary of the bus manufacturer, called North West Bus & Coach Repairs which was renamed to Darwen North West after the acquisition of assets by Darwen Group. It was later dissolved in 2013.

References

External links
East Lancashire Coachbuilders

 
1934 establishments in England
Vehicle manufacturing companies established in 1934
Companies based in Blackburn
Defunct companies of England
Switch Mobility
Companies that have entered administration in the United Kingdom